Adriani may refer to:

People
 Camillus Adriani, a Roman Catholic prelate who served as Auxiliary Bishop of Ostia-Velletri
 Giovanni Battista Adriani (1511/1513–1579), Italian historian
 Götz Adriani (born 1940), German art historian
 Isabelle Adriani (born 1972), Italian actress
 Jerry Adriani (1947–2017), Brazilian singer, musician and actor
 Nicolaus Adriani (1865–1926), Dutch missionary and linguist

Other
 Alberto Adriani Municipality, municipality in Venezuela
 Scoliacma adriani, a moth found in Papua
 Spilarctia adriani, a moth found in Papua

See also
 Andriani